Phyllodulcin is a dihydroisocoumarin found in Hydrangea macrophylla and Hydrangea serrata. It is a sweetener 400–800 times sweeter than sugar.

See also 
 Amacha

References

External links

Dihydroisocoumarins
Sugar substitutes
Vanilloids